General Hart may refer to:

Charles E. Hart (1900–1991), U.S. Army lieutenant general
Franklin A. Hart (1894–1967), U.S. Marine Corps four-star general
George Vaughan Hart (British Army officer) (1752–1832), British Army general
Henry George Hart (1808–1878), British Army lieutenant general
Herbert Hart (general) (1882–1968), New Zealand Military Forces brigadier general
Reginald Hart (1848–1931), British Army general

See also
William Wright Harts (1866–1961), U.S. Army brigadier general
Attorney General Hart (disambiguation)